The Terre Blanche Ladies Open is a women's professional golf tournament played as part of the LET Access Series, held since 2010 at Domaine de Terre Blanche in Provence on the French Riviera.

The tournament served as season opener for the LET Access Series, held in March or April, until 2020 when it was moved to October due to the COVID-19 pandemic, before being cancelled.

Winners

^Shortened to 36 holes due to weather

See also
French Riviera Masters – former European Senior Tour event at the same venue

References

External links

LET Access Series events
Golf tournaments in France